The Autism Diagnostic Observation Schedule (ADOS) is a standardized diagnostic test for diagnosing and assessing autism, now in its second edition as of 2012. It is considered to be a "gold standard" in diagnosing Autism Spectrum Disorder (ASD).

The protocol consists of a series of structured and semi-structured tasks, that involve social interaction between the examiner and the person under assessment. The examiner observes and identifies segments of the subject's behavior, and assigns these to predetermined observational categories. Categorized observations are subsequently combined to produce quantitative scores for analysis. Research-determined cut-offs identify the potential diagnosis of autism spectrum disorder, allowing a standardized assessment of autistic symptoms.

The Autism Diagnostic Interview-Revised (ADI-R), a companion instrument, is a structured interview conducted with the parents of the referred individual, and covers the subject's full developmental history. The ADI-R has lower sensitivity but similar specificity to the ADOS.

History 

The Autism Diagnostic Observation Schedule was created by Catherine Lord, Michael Rutter, Pamela C. DiLavore and Susan Risi in 1989. It became commercially available in 2001 through WPS (Western Psychological Services).

Method

The ADOS consists of a series of structured and semi-structured tasks, and generally takes from 30 to 60 minutes to administer. During this time, the examiner provides a series of opportunities for the subject to show social and communication behaviors relevant to the diagnosis of autism.

Each subject is administered activities from just one of five modules (T, 1, 2, 3, 4). The selection of an appropriate module is based on the developmental and language level of the patient. The only developmental level not served by the ADOS is that for adolescents and adults who are nonverbal. The ADOS should not be used for formal diagnosis with individuals who are blind, deaf, or otherwise seriously impaired by sensory or motor disorders, such as cerebral palsy or muscular dystrophy.

Modules

Module 1 is used with children who use little or no phrase speech. Subjects who do use phrase speech, but do not speak fluently, are administered Module 2. Since these modules both require the subject to move around the room, the ability to walk is generally taken as a minimum developmental requirement to use of the instrument as a whole. Module 3 is for children/adolescents who are verbally fluent, and Module 4 is used with older adolescents and adults who are verbally fluent. Some examples of Modules 1 or 2 include response to name, social smile, and free or bubble play. Modules 3 or 4 can include reciprocal play and communication, exhibition of empathy, or comments on others' emotions. A major difference between modules 3 and 4 is the reliance of module 4 primarily on questions and verbal responses (as opposed to actions during play).

Revision

A revision, the Autism Diagnostic Observation Schedule, Second Edition (ADOS-2), was released by WPS in May 2012. It includes updated norms, improved algorithms for Modules 1 to 3, and a new Toddler Module (T) that facilitates assessment in children ages 12 to 30 months.

Modules after revision  

 Toddler Module (12–30 months - does not speak in phrases) 

This module consists of eleven primary activities and four secondary tasks. At such a young age, diagnosis is difficult to make. So the clinical observations are very important in this module for further assessments. The examiner's assessment is based more on different areas to be aware of, rather than any "cutoff" points.

 Module 1 (31 months and older children- do not speak consistently in phrases)

This module consists of ten activities

 Free play
 Response to name
 Response to joint attention
 Bubble play
 Anticipation of a routine with objects
 Responsive social smile
 Anticipation of a social routine 
 Functional and symbolic imitation
 Birthday party
 Snack

 Module 2 ( children of all ages, who speak in phrases, but have not yet developed fluent verbal language)

This module consists of fourteen activities

 Construction task
 Response to name
 Make-Believe play
 Joint interactive play
 Conversation
 Response to joint attention
 Demonstration task
 Description of a picture
 Telling a story from a book
 Free play
 Birthday party
 Snack
 Anticipation of a routine with objects
 Bubble play

 Module 3 ( children who have a fluent language and younger adolescence)

This module consists of fourteen activities

 Construction task
 Make- Believe play
 Joint interactive play
 Demonstration Task
 Description of a picture
 Telling a story from a book
 Cartoons
 Conversation and reporting
 Emotions
 Social difficulties and annoyance
 Break
 Friends, relationships and marriage
 Loneliness
 Creating a story

 Module 4 (adolescents and adults with fluent speech)

This module consists of ten- fifteen activities (those with * are optional)

 Construction task *
 Telling a story from a book
 Description of picture *
 Conversation and reporting
 Current work or school *
 Social difficulties and annoyance
 Emotions
 Demonstration task
 Cartoons *
 Break
 Daily living *
 Friends, relationships and marriage
 Loneliness
 Plans and hopes
 Creating a story

Diagnostic accuracy 
The social communication difficulties which the ADOS and ADOS-2 seek to measure are not unique to ASD; there is a heightened risk of false positives in individuals with other psychological disorders. In particular, an increased level of false positives has been observed in adults with psychosis; while case reports indicate that such false positives may also occur in cases of childhood-onset schizophrenia, which is an exceptionally rare entity with a frequency of 1 in 40000. There is evidence that adults with schizophrenia demonstrate an increased incidence of autistic features compared to the general population, resulting in higher ADOS scores, though schizophrenia patients also experience positive symptoms of psychosis (e.g. hallucinations, delusions, formal thought disorders). A 2016 study found that 21% of children with a diagnosis of ADHD (and without a concurrent diagnosis of ASD) scored in the autism spectrum range on the ADOS total score.

A 2018 Cochrane systematic review included 12 studies of ADOS diagnostic accuracy in pre-school children (Modules 1 and 2). The summary sensitivity was 0.94 (95% CI 0.89 to 0.97), with sensitivity in individual studies ranging from 0.76 to 0.98. The summary specificity was 0.80 (95% CI 0.68 to 0.88), with specificity in individual studies ranging from 0.20 to 1.00. The studies were evaluated for bias using the QUADAS-2 framework; of the 12 included studies, 8 were evaluated as having a high risk of bias, while for the remaining four there was insufficient information available for the risk of bias to be properly evaluated. The authors could not identify any studies for the ADOS-2; the scope of the review was limited to preschool age children (mean age under 6 years), which excluded studies of Modules 3 and 4 from the meta-analysis. One included study examined the additive sensitivity and specificity of the ADOS used in combination with the ADI-R; that study found an 11% improvement in specificity (compared to ADOS alone) at the cost of a 14% reduction in sensitivity; however, due to overlapping confidence intervals, that result could not be considered statistically significant.

References

Further reading

External links 
 Autism Resource - Glossary of Terms
 FAQs on the ADOS
 The ADOS test from a Parents Point of View

Autism screening and assessment tools